Pholistoma is a small genus of flowering plants in the borage family known generally as fiestaflowers. There are three species, all native to a section of western North America between Oregon and Baja California. They are fleshy annual herbs producing angled bristly or prickly stems with several brittle branches. The deeply lobed, bristly leaves are borne on winged petioles that clasp the stem at their bases. The plants bear rotate flowers in shades of blue, purple, or white depending on species.

Species:
Pholistoma auritum - blue fiestaflower
Pholistoma membranaceum - white fiestaflower
Pholistoma racemosum - racemose fiestaflower

External links
Jepson Manual Treatment

Hydrophylloideae
Boraginaceae genera